Profile of a Man or Male Portrait is a tempera on panel painting, Museo Poldi Pezzoli in Milan. It is attributed to Andrea Mantegna, though its dating and attribution are uncertain. Some have attributed it to Cosmè Tura, Francesco Bonsignori and others, though it is now more usually attributed to Mantegna, either from his stay in Ferrara in 1448-50 (revealing the influence of Rogier van der Weyden - he may have met him or seen his work there) or from his arrival in Mantua in 1460 (where he was given various portrait commissions). The subject is unknown, though his costume and hat suggest a Venetian magistrate, a lawyer or a nobleman.

External links
Andrea Mantegna - inv. 1592 | Museo Poldi Pezzoli

1440s paintings
1460s paintings
Paintings by Andrea Mantegna
Paintings in the collection of the Museo Poldi Pezzoli
15th-century portraits
Portraits of men